The 2018 CAA men's soccer tournament, was the 36th edition of the tournament. It determined the Colonial Athletic Association's automatic berth into the 2018 NCAA Division I Men's Soccer Championship. The tournament will began November 3 and concluded on November 11.

Top-seeded James Madison won the CAA Tournament, marking their sixth ever CAA Tournament title, and their first since 2014. En route to the final, they defeated defending champions, William & Mary, in the semifinals before beating Hofstra in penalty kicks in the final. JMU striker, Manuel Ferriol was named the MVP of the Tournament. With the title, the Dukes earned an automatic berth into the NCAA Tournament. 

In addition to the Dukes, regular season runners-up, and tournament semifinalists, UNC Wilmington earned an at-large bid into the NCAA Tournament. In the tournament, the Seahawks were eliminated in the first round by Furman by the virtue of penalty kicks. James Madison defeated High Point in the first round and upset fifth-seeded North Carolina and twelfth-seeded Virginia Tech in the second round and third rounds respectively before falling at Michigan State in the Elite Eight.

Seeds

Bracket

Results

First round

Semifinals

Final

Statistics

Goalscorers

2 Goals

 Reeves Trott – William & Mary
  Matt Vowinkel – Hofstra

1 Goal

 Nathan Edmunds – Delaware
 Ryan Mertz – Delaware
 Luke Brown – Hofstra
 Sean Nealis – Hofstra
 Manuel Ferriol – James Madison
 Carson Jeffris – James Madison
 Tim Judge – James Madison
 Danny Reynolds – UNCW
 Julian Ngoh – William & Mary

All Tournament Team

References

External links 
 CAA Men's Soccer Tournament

CAA Men's Soccer Tournament
Caa Men's Soccer
Caa Men's Soccer
Caa Men's Soccer